Providence is an unincorporated community in Simpson County, Kentucky, United States.  It lies along Routes 383 and 591 southwest of the city of Franklin, the county seat of Simpson County.  Its elevation is 735 feet (224 m).

References

Unincorporated communities in Simpson County, Kentucky
Unincorporated communities in Kentucky